Alicia Cervantes Herrera (born 24 January 1994) is a Mexican football forward who currently plays for Liga MX Femenil side Guadalajara.

Career
Alicia Cervantes was born on 24 January 1994 in Arandas, Jalisco.

She made her professional debut playing for Atlas on 29 July 2017 in a match against Guadalajara. Cervantes left Atlas at the end of the tournament because the club management refused to raise her $1500 MXN monthly wage (approximately $60 USD).

In 2019 she moved to Monterrey where she played for two seasons, winning the Apertura 2019 championship with the  Rayadas.

In June 2020, Cervantes was transferred to Guadalajara.

In January 2022, IFFHS recognized Cervantes as the top first-division scorer in the world in 2021.

International goals

Personal life
Despite making her professional debut with Guadalajara's rivals Atlas, Cervantes stated that she has always been a Guadalajara supporter, thus being able to play for her favorite team in 2020 when she was transferred to the Chivas.

Career statistics

Club

Honours

Club
Monterrey
Liga MX Femenil: Apertura 2019

Guadalajara
Liga MX Femenil: Apertura 2021

Guadalajara
Liga MX Femenil: Clausura 2022

References

External links
 

1994 births
Living people
Footballers from Jalisco
Mexican women's footballers
Atlas F.C. (women) footballers
C.F. Monterrey (women) players
C.D. Guadalajara (women) footballers
Liga MX Femenil players
Mexico women's international footballers
Women's association football forwards
People from Arandas, Jalisco
Mexican footballers